Rampurwa, Mehsi is a village situated in East Champaran District in the Indian state of Bihar. The village is commonly known as Rampurwa among the localities. It lies in the Mirjapur Panchayat region. It is situated at the bank of river Burhi Gandak River on whose bank the village has flourished. It is well connected by road and railways. The nearest highway is NH-28, which is 1 km from the village. The nearest railway station is Mehsi Railway Station, which is around 4 km from the village.

The village is located 1 km east of Mehsi police station. Mehsi is an entry point of East Champaran if travelling from Patna, Muzaffarpur to Raxaul, connected both by railway and roadway. This small community has a number of places of interest at the east side of railway station. These include Mirza Halim Shah mosque, dargah, a very old library 'Nagrik Pustakalaya', an old high school (Tirhut Vidyalaya) of the English period, orchards of lichi and mangoes and other places of interest. There are many button factories, a small scale industry, although most of the people depend upon agriculture and commerce. Mehsi was the birthplace of the writer and intellectual, Rajkamal Chaudhary. The last sentence about the birthplace of Rajkamal Chaudhary is not at Mehsi of District East Champaran, but it is at Saharsa district of Bihar.

Location

The village is located 1 km east of Mehsi Police-station. The nearest highway is NH-28 which is 1.5 km west of village.

River 

The village is situated on the bank of a Himalayan foothills Someshwer Range  originated, perennial river Budhi Gandak on which bank the village has grown up and flourished.

Economy 

The basic lively-hood is agriculture and cottage industry. Rampurwa is one of major producer of lichi in Mehsi. There are many button factories, a small scale industry, although most of the people depend upon agriculture and commerce.

Demographics

As of the 2001 India census the total population of the village is 375. The literacy rate is 65.61%. The female literacy rate is 47.1%. The male literacy rate is 78.71%.

Climate

The summer, April–July is extremely hot and humid (28/40 deg C,90% Max.) and winter is cold, around 06/20 deg C.

Gallery

Notes

The number of households in Rampurwa is 48. All the households are rural households.
Female to male ratio of Rampurwa is 91.33% compared to the Bihar's female to male ratio 91.93%. 
The literacy rate of the village is 65.61% compared to the literacy rate of state 47%. The literacy rate of the village is better than state literacy rate. 
The female literacy rate is 47.1% compared to male literacy rate of 82.99%.
The total working population is 69.47% of the total population. 91.84% of the men are working population . 45.65% of the women are working population.
The main working population is 44.56% of the total population. 68.71% of the men are main working population . 18.84% of the women are main working population . While the marginal working population is 24.91% of the total population. 23.13% of the men are marginal working population. 26.81% of the women are marginal working population.
The total non-working population is 30.53% of the total population. 8.16% of the men are non-working population . 54.35% of the women are non-working population.

References

External links
 All about Bihar
 About Mehsi

Villages in East Champaran district